The Gua Sha Treatment is a Chinese movie released in 2001 starring Tony Leung Ka-Fai, Zhu Xu, and Jiang Wenli.  It is a story about cultural conflicts experienced by a Chinese family in the United States.

Plot
Grandfather Xu (Zhu Xu) comes from China to visit the family of his son, Datong Xu (Tony Leung), in St. Louis. While there, he gives his grandson, Dennis Xu (Dennis Zhu), a treatment of Gua Sha to treat a slight fever (being unable to read English labels of medicine).  Social workers, however, mistake the traditional Chinese medical treatment for child abuse due to the obvious marks left on Dennis' back.  The life of the family is sent into turmoil when Dennis is taken away by the child protection agency. In court, the prosecution includes Datong's inclusion of a Chinese legendary character Sun Wukong (Chinese traditional: 孫悟空; simplified: 孙悟空) in his design of a violent video game. The prosecution implies that since Datong includes violence in his game, he values it.

A furious Datong insists that the prosecution does not understand the cultural value of Sun Wukong and that the icon's inclusion does not mean he abuses his son. He insists that what he does in his job does not relate to how he runs his home. Meanwhile, Grandfather Xu leaves America because he finds that the living environment is really not suitable for him, as he does not want to live in a place where a simple, harmless treatment like Gua Sha, which is so common in China, is treated as child abuse. Furthermore, he cannot converse in English. Datong's friend and lawyer, John Quilin (Hollis Houston), tries Gua Sha and proves that the treatment leaves painful-looking marks that are not actually painful or harmful at all.  Finally, Datong is able to return home and the family is reunited. This movie's story is meant to demonstrate the difference between western and Chinese culture.

References

External links

The Gua Sha Treatment at the Chinese Movie Database

2001 films
2000s Mandarin-language films
2001 drama films
Films set in the United States
Chinese drama films
2000s Chinese films